Mikael Rynell (born 25 February 1982) is a former Swedish professional footballer who last played for FC Gute as a midfielder.

References

External links

1982 births
Living people
Swedish footballers
IF Brommapojkarna players
Landskrona BoIS players
Herfølge Boldklub players
Esbjerg fB players
Hammarby Fotboll players
Danish Superliga players
Swedish expatriate footballers
Expatriate men's footballers in Denmark
Association football midfielders
Footballers from Stockholm